Joseph "Jos" Koetz (29 May 1897 in Esch-sur-Alzette – 13 June 1976) was a footballer from Luxembourg who participated at two Summer Olympics, 1920 and 1924. He was also part of the squad for the 1928 tournament, but did not play. Most of his career he played for CS Fola Esch.

References

External links
Joseph Koetz's profile at Sports-reference.com

1897 births
1976 deaths
Luxembourgian footballers
Luxembourg international footballers
Olympic footballers of Luxembourg
Footballers at the 1920 Summer Olympics
Footballers at the 1924 Summer Olympics
Footballers at the 1928 Summer Olympics
Sportspeople from Esch-sur-Alzette
Association football defenders